Longley is a small district in Huddersfield, West Yorkshire, England between Newsome and Lowerhouses.

The area is mainly made up of woodland and a 9-hole golf course (Longley Park).

Longley Old Hall, a listed building, is also in the area.

See also
Listed buildings in Huddersfield (Newsome Ward - outer areas)

External links
 Longley Old Hall website

Areas of Huddersfield